The Dean Single, 3031 Class, or Achilles Class was a type of steam locomotive built by the British Great Western Railway between 1891 and 1899. They were designed by William Dean for passenger work. The first 30 members of the class were built as 2-2-2s of the 3001 Class.

The first eight members of the class (numbers 3021-3028, built April–August 1891) were built as convertible  broad gauge 2-2-2 locomotives, being converted to standard gauge in mid-1892, at the end of broad gauge running on the Great Western Railway. A further 22 were built in late 1891 and early 1892, this time as standard gauge engines.

Although the  3001 class were fitted with larger boilers than earlier GWR 2-2-2 classes, the diameter of the boiler was constrained by its position between the  driving wheels. Thus boiler capacity could only be increased by making the boiler longer, not wider, bringing the smokebox and cylinders in front of the leading axle. The extra weight of the larger boilers was borne by the leading wheels, making the locomotives unstable, particularly at speed. On 16 September 1893 No. 3021 Wigmore Castle, hauling an express train, was derailed in Box Tunnel when the front axle broke. The cause of the accident was thought to be excessive weight being carried on the front axle, so it was decided to replace the leading pair of wheels in the 3001 class with a bogie.

In the 3001 class the steam chest was located underneath the cylinders, and contained two slide valves. The inverted placement of the valves allowed them to drop away from the face of the steam ports when steam was shut off, thus reducing wear. The steam chest and valves lay above the front carrying axle, and there was sufficient clearance to allow the steam chest cover to be removed over the axle for maintenance.

Replacing the axle with a bogie of conventional design would have obstructed access to the port faces. Dean instead used a suspension bogie, in which the weight of the locomotive was transferred upwards to the bogie by four bolts mounted on the inside frames. The centre pin of the bogie rotated in a spring-centred block mounted beneath the steam chest on cross beams. This setup gave sufficient clearance so that, when the bolts were undone, the front end of the locomotive raised, and the bogie was run out from underneath, the steam chest cover could be removed without hindrance.

No. 3021 was rebuilt as a 4-2-2 in March 1894. Between June and December 1894 the 28 remaining locomotives of the 3001 class were rebuilt. The first of a further 50 new bogie singles was also built in March 1894, the last of the class being outshopped in March 1899.

In 1900, George Jackson Churchward replaced the boiler on number 3027 Worcester with a parallel Standard 2 boiler. Twelve further engines were similarly converted in 1905 and 1906.

Despite the locomotives' speed, the 4-2-2 design was soon found to be outdated and unsuitable for more modern operation. A proposal to improve their performance by fitting them with long-travel valves was found to be impracticable; the existing valves were directly driven from eccentrics mounted on the driving axle, and there was insufficient clearance to fit larger eccentrics. Churchward considered rebuilding the class as Armstrong Class 4-4-0s with
 coupled wheels. This scheme was not carried through because the connecting rods would not clear the lower slide bar, and the valve gear would be out of alignment. An alternative proposal to drop the locomotive , and raise the buffer beam and dragbox, was also rejected on the grounds of cost. The class were gradually withdrawn between 1908 and 1915, with the last survivor, no. 3074 Princess Helena, being withdrawn in December 1916. All of the originals were scrapped, but a non-working replica was built in the early 1980s.

Notable members of the class
3065 Duke of Connaught made a record-breaking run with the Ocean Mail on 9 May 1904 (having taken over the train from City of Truro at Bristol), covering the distance from Bristol (Pylle Hill) to Paddington in 99 minutes 46 seconds as part of a run from Plymouth to Paddington in 227 minutes.

3041 The Queen, originally named James Mason, was an example of this class allocated to Royal Train duties.

Number 3046 Lord of the Isles has enjoyed a certain amount of celebrity, having been chosen as the prototype for a Tri-ang model locomotive. Since then the engine has also been modelled by Brio and Matchbox. In 2006, Hornby also produced a limited edition of the same model, this time bearing the name Lorna Doone. Hornby also produced Royal Sovereign, Great Western, Duke of Edinburgh and Achilles in 2008, 2010, 2009 and 2020 respectively.

Replica

None of the original class survive, but a static replica of The Queen was commissioned by Tussauds for the Railways and Royalty exhibition at Windsor and Eton Central railway station. The replica loco was completed in December 1982 and displayed outside Steamtown in January 1983 (where it was constructed), before being transported by road to Windsor on 12 January 1983 and arriving on 14 January.
The main frames, footplate, 'boiler', smokebox, cab and splashers were fabricated by Babcock's of Tipton. The tender was modified from an LBSCR C2x tender. Parts from a GWR tender, that came from the Dumbleton Hall Preservation Society, were used to provide the wheels for the front bogie and the rear wheels. The top halves of the driving wheels do not exist, while the bottom halves were cast from 2 quarters, being bolted together to make a half. The driving wheels also don't sit on the rail so the loco could be wheeled into position on its front bogie and rear wheels.
Some boiler fittings were obtained from the Great Western Society and sandblasted, and the dome and safety valve bonnet were made by Newcastle Metal Spinners.
Tussaud's fitted smoke and steam generators, so steam was emitted from the cab, whistles, safety valves and smoke from the chimney. A sound unit was also fitted.

The engine remains there, but the tender was scrapped to make more space for the shopping centre occupying that station building. The Bluebell Railway Atlantic Group purchased the axleboxes, springs and the complete wheel sets from the tender for use in their newbuild Atlantic project.

Numbering

Models
Hornby Railways manufacture a model of the 3031 Class in OO gauge.

A model of the "Duke of Connaught" was produced by Lesney Products as Y-14 in the Models of Yesteryear range from 1959 to 1963.

Civic heraldry

The coat of arms of the old Borough of Swindon (1900–74) includes an image of 3029 White Horse on the shield. The coat of arms was displayed on the splashers of the last Castle Class built (No. 7037 Swindon). STEAM Museum of the Great Western Railway at Swindon acquired one of the splashers in 2012.

Notes

References

External links 

 Dean Single Info
Photo of 3009 Flying Dutchman from 1900

3031
2-2-2 locomotives
4-2-2 locomotives
Railway locomotives introduced in 1891
Standard gauge steam locomotives of Great Britain
Passenger locomotives